The 2012 Masters (officially the 2012 BGC Masters) was a professional non-ranking snooker tournament held between 15 and 22 January 2012 at the Alexandra Palace in London, England. This was the first time that Stephen Hendry didn't participate at the Masters since his début in 1989, and the first time that BGC Partners sponsored the event.

Ding Junhui was the defending champion, but he lost in the first round 4–6 against Ronnie O'Sullivan. Ronnie O'Sullivan made the highest break of the tournament in the second round against Judd Trump, making a 141.

Neil Robertson won his first Masters title by defeating Shaun Murphy 10–6 in the final. This was Robertson's 10th professional title and his second Triple Crown title after winning the 2010 World Snooker Championship.

Field
Defending champion Ding Junhui was the number 1 seed with World Champion John Higgins seeded 2. The remaining places were allocated to players based on the latest world rankings (revision 2). Martin Gould was making his debut in the Masters.

Prize fund
The breakdown of prize money for this year is shown below:
Winner: £150,000
Runner-up: £75,000
Semi-finals: £30,000
Quarter-finals: £20,000
Last 16: £15,000
Highest break: £15,000
Total: £500,000

Main draw

Final

Century breaks
Total: 21 
 141, 125  Ronnie O'Sullivan
 140, 121, 107  Judd Trump
 139, 122, 107, 102, 101, 100  Shaun Murphy
 124  Mark Allen
 119, 103, 101, 100, 100  Neil Robertson
 112, 110  Mark Selby
 109  John Higgins
 100  Stephen Lee

References

Masters (snooker)
Masters
Masters (snooker)
Masters (snooker)
January 2012 sports events in the United Kingdom